A panini (meaning "small bread, bread rolls")  or panino (meaning "bread roll") is a sandwich made with Italian bread (such as ciabatta, rosetta, and michetta). They are sometimes served warm after grilling or toasting.

In many English-speaking countries, the name panini is given to a grilled sandwich made from any type of bread. Examples of bread types used for modern panini include baguette, ciabatta, focaccia and michetta. The bread is cut horizontally and filled with deli ingredients such as cheese, ham, mortadella, salami, or other food, and often served warm after having been pressed by a warming grill.

Etymology
Panini is a word of Italian origin. In Italian the noun panino (plural panini) is a diminutive of pane ("bread") and refers to a bread roll. Panino imbottito ("stuffed panino") refers to a sandwich, but the word panino is also often used alone to indicate a sandwich in general. Similar to panino is tramezzino, a triangular or square sandwich made up of two slices of soft white bread with the crusts removed.

In English-speaking countries, panini is widely used as the singular form, with the plural form panini or paninis, though some speakers use singular panino and plural panini as in Italian.

History

Although the first U.S. reference to panini dates to 1956, and a precursor appeared in a 16th-century Italian cookbook, the sandwiches became trendy in Milanese bars, called paninoteche, in the 1970s and 1980s. Trendy U.S. restaurants began selling panini, with distinctive variations appearing in various cities.

During the 1980s, the term paninaro arose in Italy to denote a member of a youth culture represented by patrons of sandwich bars such as Milan's Al Panino and Italy's first US-style fast food restaurants. Paninari were depicted as right-leaning, fashion-fixated individuals, delighting in showcasing early-1980s consumer goods as status symbols.

Grills  

A panini press or panini grill is a contact grill for heating sandwiches, meat products, vegetables, and specialty menu items, nearly always with electric elements, comprising a heated bottom plate that is fixed, and a heated top plate that closes towards the bottom plate and comes in contact with the food. The function of the panini grill is to heat food to an appropriate internal temperature with desirable external characteristics (i.e., melted cheese, crisp finish, grill marks).

See also
 
 List of sandwiches

References

Sources
 
 
 

Italian sandwiches